Gastón Gaudio defeated Mariano Puerta 6–4, 6–4 to win the 2005 ATP Buenos Aires singles competition. Guillermo Coria was the champion but did not defend his title.

Seeds

  Carlos Moyà (quarterfinals)
  Gastón Gaudio (champion)
  Guillermo Cañas (second round)
  Fernando González (withdrew)
  Juan Ignacio Chela (first round)
  Filippo Volandri (first round)
  Rafael Nadal (quarterfinals)
  Mariano Zabaleta (second round)

Draw

Finals

Top half

Bottom half

External links
 2005 ATP Buenos Aires Singles draw
 Doubles draw
 Qualifying Singles draw

Singles
Copa
2005 ATP Tour
ATP Buenos Aires